Sakram is a mountain of the Garhwal Himalaya in Uttarakhand India. It's situated on the eastern rim of Nanda Devi Sanctuary on the watershed of Milam Glacier and Nanda Devi basin. It is 129th highest located entirely within the Uttrakhand. Nanda Devi, is the highest mountain in this category. It lies 1.2 km SSW of Lohar Deo  its nearest higher neighbor and 3.3 km SSE of Deo Damla . Kalanka  lies 11.9 km NNW and 8.7 km SW lies Nanda Devi .

Climbing history
Sakram  was first climbed by Eric Shipton's team in 1934 expedition into the Nanda Devi sanctuary.

A British team led by Colin Read climbed Sakram via south east face in 1976.

Glaciers and rivers
Sakram Glacier on the eastern side joins Milam Glacier from there emerges Goriganga River that later joins the Kali River at Jauljibi. Uttari Nanda Devi Glacier on the western side joins Uttari Rishi Glacier and drains into Rish Ganga. Rishi Ganga met with Dhauliganga River near Rini. Later Dhauli ganga met with Alaknanda at Vishnuprayag. Alaknanda River is one of the main tributaries of river Ganga that later joins Bhagirathi River the other main tributaries of river Ganga at Devprayag and became Ganga there after.

Neighboring peaks
Neighboring peaks of Sakram: 
 Nanda Devi: 
 Deo Damla: 
 Lohar Deo: 
 Lhatu Dhura: 
 Rishi Kot: 
 Changabang:

See also

 List of Himalayan peaks of Uttarakhand

References

Mountains of Uttarakhand
Six-thousanders of the Himalayas
Geography of Chamoli district